Hansen House  (Beit Hansen) is a  historic building in the Talbiya neighborhood of Jerusalem, Israel established in 1887 as a leprosy hospital.

History

In 1887, when the lepers' asylum in Mamilla became overcrowded, Jerusalem's Anglican-German Protestant community initiated the establishment of a larger facility designed by German architect Conrad Schick.The building, surrounded by a high stone wall, was established in an isolated spot northwest of the German Colony with the name of the institution, Jesus Hilfe (Jesus's Help), inscribed on a lintel on the main façade. The Herrenhut Brotherhood of the Moravian Church was responsible for fundraising and management.An innovative feature of the building was the construction of a self-standing two-story bathroom tower.  
 
Over the years, Jerusalem grew until the asylum's location was no longer secluded yet it retained an aura of mystery. The public regarded the asylum as a closed, isolated institution, although patients were in fact free to leave, and families could visit. The patients were from Muslim, Christian and Jewish communities throughout the country. Between the 1880s and the 1950s, the House hosted between 30 to 40 lepers and 3 to 5 nurses at any one time.
 
In 1950, the Jewish National Fund bought the compound, and the Israeli Ministry of Health took over the running of the asylum, renaming it the Hansen Government Hospital(after physician Gerhard Hansen, who identified the Leprosy bacteria). With the development of an effective cure for leprosy, more patients were rehabilitated and discharged, resulting in the closure of the hospitalization unit. From 2000 until 2009, the asylum operated as an ambulatory clinic before finally closing down.

Restoration

In 2011, the Jerusalem Development Authority commenced Hansen House renovation and preservation project. After careful thought about the house's new function, they decided to convert the historical asylum into a design, media and technology cultural center, where academic research, development, education, and public activities could take place. The conversion was headed by the Jerusalem Development Authority and Ran Wolf Urban Planning and Project Management, in cooperation with preservation architect Nahum Meltzer. This renovation and preservation work minimized interference with the spectacular structure of Hansen House. The work focused on the construction of modern infrastructure that would serve the new cultural center, as well as the restoration of the historical garden and trees.

Exhibition space
Hansen House has a historical exhibit focused on its past as a leper asylum and hosts changing exhibits.

Art school
The Bezalel Academy Graduate School is located within Hansen House through a unique model, incorporating academic research and studies with communal and social activity. Hansen House houses three graduate programs: the Industrial Design Department (design and technology, design and innovation management, and experimental design), the Graduate Program in Urban Design, and a Master in Policy & Theory of the Arts. Bezalel's External Studies and a variety of preparatory programs are also taught at Hansen House.
Fabrication Laboratory - A digital manufacturing lab.

Mamuta project 
The Sela-Manca group of independent Jerusalem-based artists initiated Mamuta, a project by Hearat Shulayim (footnote) Foundation in the fields of performance art, video, poetry, and public art. Since 2009, Mamuta has aimed to provide a framework for different types of creators—curators, architects, designers, and researchers—who are interested in sharing, knowledge exchange, intensive dialogue, and technological innovation. By creating an active community of artists, Mamuta allows for personal growth and collective work.

Coffee shop
Ofaimme Farm's Coffee House – The Ofaimme Farm for Sustainable Agriculture  adheres to strict organic standards as well as fair trade practices at their farm in the Negev Desert. Their handmade produce is slowly crafted using traditional techniques to create food that is tasty and healthy, guaranteed to be free of any type of genetic engineering, preservatives, pesticides, and hormones. All of their products are manufactured and packaged with complete respect for the environment and for the people who take part in the creative process.

References

External links

 Letter from Rivka Regev, daughter of Dr. Moshe Goldgraber, the in-house physician

Buildings and structures in Jerusalem
Hospitals in Jerusalem
Leper hospitals
Bezalel Academy of Arts and Design
Moravian Church
Talbiya